Joseph Santo is a former Republican member of the Connecticut Senate, representing Norwalk and part of Darien, Connecticut in Connecticut's 25th District from 1986 to 1987. He won the seat in a special election to fill a vacancy caused by the death of State Senator Andrew J. Santaniello, Jr. He defeated John Atkin for the seat, but was defeated by Atkin later the same year in the general election.

After his term in the Connecticut Senate, he was elected to the Norwalk Common Council. He also served on the Norwalk Zoning Commission.

References 

Connecticut city council members
Republican Party Connecticut state senators
Politicians from Norwalk, Connecticut